Lednagullin  is a village on the south east shore of Armadale Bay in Sutherland, Scottish Highlands and is in the Scottish council area of Highland.

References

Populated places in Sutherland
Lednagullin